Sean Ross Cary (born 10 March 1971) is an Australian former cricketer. Cary played for Western Australia in Australian domestic cricket. After retiring he became an administrator and has served as a match referee.

References

1971 births
Living people
Western Australia cricketers
Australian cricketers
Cricket match referees
Cricketers from Perth, Western Australia